Bala Kuh (also Romanized as Bālā Kūh; also known as Balakukh) is a village in Darram Rural District, in the Central District of Tarom County, Zanjan Province, Iran. At the 2006 census, its population was 76, in 35 families.

References 

Populated places in Tarom County